Frida (with variants Freda, Frieda, Frinta and Freida) is a feminine given name. In central and eastern Europe, Frida is a short form of compound names containing the Germanic element fried meaning "peace".

People

Freda
Freda Betti (1924–1979), French opera singer
Freda Corbet (1900–1993), British politician
Freda Dowie (1928–2019), English actress
Freda Du Faur (1882–1935), Australian mountaineer
Freda Dudley Ward (1894–1983), English socialite and mistress of future king Edward VIII
Freda Foh Shen (born 1948), American film, television and theatre actress
Freda Gardner (1929–2020), former Moderator of the General Assembly of the Presbyterian Church (USA) 
Freda Jackson (1907–1990), British actress
Freda James (1911–1988), British tennis player
Freda Koblick (1920–2011), American acrylic artist and sculptor 
Freda Josephine McDonald (1906–1975), American-born French entertainer, known as Joséphine Baker
Freda Payne (born 1942), American singer and actress
Freda Warrington, British author
Freda Warfield, American politician
Freda Wright-Sorce (1955–2005), American radio broadcaster
Freda L. Wolfson (born 1954), American judge

Freedia
Big Freedia (born 1978), American musician

Frida
Frida Benneche (born 1880), American coloratura soprano
Frida Gustavsson (born 1993), Swedish model
Josefine Frida Pettersen (born 1996) Norwegian actress 
Frida Hansdotter (born 1985), Swedish alpine skier
Frida Hyvönen (born 1977), Swedish singer-songwriter
Frida Kahlo (1907–1954), Mexican painter 
Anni-Frid Lyngstad (born 1945), Swedish pop singer and member of ABBA, also known by her mononym Frida
Frida Stéenhoff (1865–1945), Swedish writer and feminist
Frida Topno (1925–2018), Indian politician
Frida Westman (born 2001), Swedish ski jumper

Frieda
Frieda Arnold (fl. 1854–fl. 1859), British courtier, dresser (lady's maid) to Queen Victoria of Great Britain.
Frieda Belinfante (1904–1995), Dutch cellist, conductor, prominent lesbian and member of the Dutch Resistance during World War II
Frieda Dänzer (1931–2015), Swiss former Alpine skier
Frieda Hempel (1885–1955), German operatic soprano
Frieda Inescort (1901–1976), Scottish stage and film actress
Frieda von Richthofen (1879–1956), wife of the writer D. H. Lawrence
Frieda Zamba (born 1965), American four-time world surfing champion

Freida
Freida Lee Mock, award-winning filmmaker
Freida Pinto (born 1984), Indian actress and model
Freida J. Riley (1937–1969), American science and math teacher

Fictional characters
Frieda (Peanuts), a character from the comic strip Peanuts
Frieda Petrenko, a character from UK TV series Holby City
Frieda Pesky, a character from the TV series The Buzz on Maggie
Frida Suarez, a character from the television series El Tigre: The Adventures of Manny Rivera
Frida Villarreal, character in the telenovela Entre el amor y el odio
Frieda, a character from the children's film, Thomas & Friends: The Great Race
Freida "Freddi", a character from the Time Warp Trio book series and the adapted TV series
Frieda Berlin, a character from the television series Orange Is the New Black
Frida, a character from the television series Hilda
Frieda Jason, a character from the Stephen King novel, Carrie
Frieda Reiss, a character from the manga series Attack on Titan and the adapted TV series.

Animals
Frida (dog), Mexican search and rescue dog

See also

Freda (disambiguation)

Norwegian feminine given names
Swedish feminine given names
Danish feminine given names
Finnish feminine given names
Icelandic feminine given names
German feminine given names
Dutch feminine given names
English feminine given names
cs:Frida
et:Frida
es:Frida (desambiguación)
nl:Frida